Andrée Desautels  (9 October 1923 – 23 February 2023) was a Canadian musician, musicologist and music educator.

Early life and training
Desautels studied piano with Isabelle Delorme and studied at the École supérieure de musique d'Outremont. She went on to study at the Conservatoire de musique du Québec à Montréal with Germaine Malépart, Isabelle Delorme and Claude Champagne. Desautels also studied the history of art and literature at the University of Montreal. She also studied privately with Andrée Vaurabourg (composition and orchestration), with Nadia Boulanger (analysis) and with Maurice Martenot (ondes Martenot). Three of her vocal works were performed at the École Normale de Musique de Paris in 1947.

Career
Desautels returned to Montreal in 1949 and taught music history and musicology at the Conservatoire de musique du Québec à Montréal until she retired in 1988. She also taught music history at the University of Montreal and the École de musique Vincent-d'Indy from 1961 to 1964. Desautels also was responsible for the programming at the JMC pavilion at Expo 67. She wrote and introduced a number of series on music for Radio Canada.

Her students included Jacques-André Houle, Richard Boulanger, Nicole Labelle and Liette Yergeau.

From 1967 to 1970, she was a member of the Canada Council. She founded the Association des professeurs of the Conservatoire de musique du Québec and served as its president from 1960 to 1968. In 1988, she received a medal from the Quebec National Assembly. In 1995, she was named to the Order of Canada.

Personal life and death
Desautels died on 23 February 2023, at the age of 99.

References 

1923 births
2023 deaths
Canadian composers
Canadian music educators
Canadian musicologists
Canadian women composers
Members of the Order of Canada
Université de Montréal alumni
Academic staff of the Université de Montréal
Women music educators
Women musicologists
French Quebecers
Musicians from Montreal